Alvar Alonso Rosell (born 13 September 1992 in Figueres, Girona) is a Spanish chess Grandmaster. He is ranked 10th best chess player in Spain.

He was champion of Spain in 2011, surpassing the player Miguel Illescas. Alonso Rosell also won other national championships; he was the 2004 champion of Spain in the U-12, the 2006 champion in U-14, the 2008 and 2009 youth champion of  Catalonia, in 2009 champion of Spain in the U-18, and the 2011 runner up in Catalonia behind Marc Narciso. In 2014 he defeated Narciso to become the 2014 Catalonia chess champion.

On 23 December 2018 he won the 5th Sunway Sitges Chess Festival by scoring 8/10, half a point more than strong grandmasters such as Vassily Ivanchuk and Dmitry Andreikin.

References

External links
 
 

1992 births
Living people
Spanish chess players
Chess grandmasters